Odile Kennel (born 1967) is a German writer of French origin known for her poetry and prose, as well as her translations.

Life and work 
Odile Kennel majored in cultural studies and also studied political sciences in Tübingen, Berlin and Lisbon and studied cultural management in Bucharest and Dijon. She grew up bilingual. Beside her own writing, which was represented often in the German media, Odile Kennel translates poetry from the French, Portuguese and Spanish language into German. She also worked for many years as a cultural mediator. Odile Kennel does public readings of her own works on a regular basis.
Odile Kennel works and lives in Berlin.

Publications

Prose 
 Wimpernflug – eine atemlose Erzählung, Edition Ebersbach, Dortmund 2000
 Was Ida sagt. Novel, dtv, Munich 2011, 
 Mit Blick auf See. Novel, dtv, Munich 2017,

Poetry 
 oder wie heißt diese interplanetare Luft, dtv, Munich 2013

Translations (selected works) 
 Jacques Darras: Endlich raus aus dem Wald. 1914 noch einmal von vorne. Ein rasendes Thesengedicht. Translated from French. KLAK-Verlag 2017
 Érica Zíngano: Ich weiß nicht, warum. Zeichnungen und Texte für Unica Zürn. Translated from Portuguese, Hochroth Verlag, Berlin 2013
 Ricardo Domeneck: Körper: ein Handbuch. Translated from Portuguese, Verlagshaus J. Frank, Berlin 2013 
 Damaris Calderón: Sprache und Scharfrichter. Translated from Spanish, Parasitenpresse, Cologne 2011
 Angélica Freitas: Rilke Shake. Poems, bilingual, translated from Portuguese. Luxbooks, Wiesbaden 2011
 Jean Portante: Die Arbeit des Schattens Translated from French. Editions PHI, Esch/Alzette 2005

Awards and stipends 
 1996: Würth-Literaturpreis
 2000: Stipend of the Senate of Berlin
 2001: Stipend to stay at Künstlerhaus Lukas by the Kulturfonds foundation
 2004: Award of the Rheinsberger Autorinnenforums
 2009: Stipend of the German Translators Fund DÜF for the translation of the poetrybook "Rilke Shake" by Angélica Freitas
 2011: Stipend of the Foundation Künstlerdorf Schöppingen
 2011: Alfred-Döblin-Stipendium
 2012: Stipend of the German Translators Fund DÜF for the translation of a poetrybook by Ricardo Domeneck
 2013: Gisela-Scherer-Stipendium
 2014: Stipend of the Stuttgarter Schriftstellerhaus
 2014: 2. winner of Lyrikpreis München
 2016: Stipend of the Senate of Berlin
 2016: Author of the year, elected by the Autorinnenvereinigung

References 

1967 births
People from Bühl (Baden)
German women poets
Living people
20th-century German women writers
French–German translators
Spanish–German translators
German translators